

2020s
2020: Not Awarded

2010s
2019: Not Awarded
2018: Not Awarded
2017: Not Awarded
2016: Sting
2015: Not Awarded
2014: Not Awarded
2013: Not Awarded
2012: Not Awarded
2011: Not Awarded
2010: Not Awarded

2000s
2009: Not Awarded
2008: Annie Lennox
2007: Not Awarded
2006: Not Awarded
2005: Not Awarded
2004: Bon Jovi
2003 (November): Not Awarded
2003 (January): Alabama
2002: Garth Brooks
2001: Janet Jackson
2000: Gloria Estefan

1990s
1999: Billy Joel
1998: Frank Sinatra
1997: Little Richard
1996: Tammy Wynette
1995: Prince
1994: Whitney Houston
1993: Bill Graham
1992: James Brown
1991: Merle Haggard
1990: Neil Diamond

1980s
1989: Willie Nelson
1988: The Beach Boys
1987: Elvis Presley
1986: Paul McCartney
1985: Loretta Lynn
1984: Michael Jackson
1983: Kenny Rogers
1982: Stevie Wonder
1981: Chuck Berry
1980: Benny Goodman

1970s
1979: Perry Como
1978: Ella Fitzgerald
1977: Johnny Cash
1976: Irving Berlin
1975: Berry Gordy
1974: Bing Crosby

American Music Awards
Awards established in 1974
1974 establishments in the United States

References